Martin Kennedy (1839 – 25 August 1916) was a 19th-century Member of Parliament from Westland, New Zealand. He was also a merchant, mine owner, businessman and Catholic layman.

He represented the Greymouth riding from December 1872 to November 1873 on the Westland County, when the county was abolished and replaced with Westland Province. He contested the election for Superintendent of Westland Province, but was beaten by James Bonar.

He represented the Grey Valley electorate from 1876 to 1878, when he resigned to concentrate on his business interests.

References

1839 births
1916 deaths
New Zealand Roman Catholics
Members of the New Zealand House of Representatives
Members of the Westland County Council
New Zealand MPs for South Island electorates